Copelatus pulchellus is a species of diving beetle. It is part of the subfamily Copelatinae in the family Dytiscidae. It was described by Johann Christoph Friedrich Klug in 1834.

References

pulchellus
Beetles described in 1834